The 2015 Perth Darts Masters was the second staging of the tournament by the Professional Darts Corporation, as a third entry in the 2015 World Series of Darts. The tournament  featured 16 players (eight top PDC Players facing eight regional qualifiers) and was held at the HBF Stadium in Perth, Western Australia from 14–16 August 2015.

Phil Taylor was the defending champion after defeating Michael van Gerwen 11–9 in the last year's final. He successfully defended his title after beating James Wade 11–7 in the final.

Prize money
The total prize fund was A$200,000.

Qualifiers

The eight seeded PDC players were:

  Phil Taylor (winner)
  Michael van Gerwen (semi-finals)
  Peter Wright (quarter-finals)
  Gary Anderson (semi-finals)
  Adrian Lewis (quarter-finals)
  James Wade (runner-up)
  Raymond van Barneveld (quarter-finals)
  Stephen Bunting (first round)

The Oceanic qualifiers were:
  Simon Whitlock (first round)
  Paul Nicholson (first round)
  Kyle Anderson (quarter-finals)
  Laurence Ryder (first round)
  Craig Caldwell (first round)
  David Platt (first round)
  Adam Rowe (first round)
  Kim Lewis (first round)

Draw

Broadcasting
The tournament was available in the following countries on these channels:

References

Perth Darts Masters
Perth Darts Masters
World Series of Darts
Sports competitions in Perth, Western Australia
2010s in Perth, Western Australia